R v Crown Zellerbach Canada Ltd [1988] 1 S.C.R. 401, is a leading constitutional decision of the Supreme Court of Canada. A deeply-divided Court upheld the validity of the Ocean Dumping Act, now part of the Canadian Environmental Protection Act, by  finding that all matters related to polluting the ocean are within the exclusive jurisdiction of the federal government owing to the national concern branch of the "peace, order, and good government" clause in the British North America Act, 1867 (now known as the Constitution Act, 1867).

The majority opinion was written by Le Dain J (joined by Dickson CJ, and McIntyre and Wilson JJ) and hinged on the "singleness, distinctiveness, and indivisibility" of the national concern that the Ocean Dumping Act addressed. The minority opinion was written by La Forest J (joined by Beetz and Lamer JJ).

See also
 List of Supreme Court of Canada cases (Dickson Court)

External links
 

Supreme Court of Canada cases
Canadian federalism case law
1988 in Canadian case law
1988 in the environment